Callava is a Spanish surname. Notable people with the surname include:

José María Callava, last governor of Spanish West Florida (1819–1821)
Andrés Echevarría Callava, known as Niño Rivera (1919–1996), Cuban musician

Spanish-language surnames